Purple raspberry is a common name for several plants which may refer to:

 Rubus occidentalis
 Rubus odoratus